Dr. Issa al-Khouli was a physician and Syrian Armed Forces brigadier general who was assassinated by three gunmen on 11 February 2012, as he stepped out his house in the neighborhood of Rukn-Eddin in Damascus. He is believed to have been the nephew of Muhammad al-Khuli, the former head of the Air Force Intelligence Directorate.  He is the first high military officer who was killed in the Syrian capital since the uprising against President Bashar al-Assad.

Career
Issa al-Khouli, an Alawite from a family with close ties inside the Assad government, trained in Romania and France. He was a specialist in physical therapy and prosthetic devices.

References

Military personnel killed in the Syrian civil war
Syrian generals
Syrian military personnel killed in action
2012 deaths
Syrian military doctors
Assassinated military personnel
Assassinated Syrian people